Afshan Qureshi is a Pakistani actress. She is known for roles in dramas Baba Jani, Barfi Laddu, Malika-e-Aliya and Log Kya Kahenge.

Early life
Afshan was born on November 19 in 1959 in Karachi, Pakistan. She completed her studies from University of Karachi.

Career
She made her debut as a child actress in 1969 and appeared in movies of Punjabi, Urdu and Pashto. She was noted for her roles in dramas Mere Hamrahi, Rang Laaga, Kalmoohi and Dil, Diya, Dehleez. She also appeared in dramas Mar Jain Bhi To Kya, Baba Jani, Barfi Laddu, Malika-e-Aliya, Umeed, Meri Zaat Zarra-e-Benishan, Umm-e-Kulsoom, and Akhri Barish. Since then she appeared in dramas Ghisi Piti Mohabbat, Log Kya Kahenge, Qayamat and Berukhi.

Personal life
Afshan was married to actor Abid Qureshi, who died. Afshan's son Faysal Qureshi is a host, producer, director and actor.

Filmography

Television

Telefilm

Film

References

External links
 
 

1959 births
Actresses in Punjabi cinema
Living people
20th-century Pakistani actresses
Pakistani television actresses
21st-century Pakistani actresses
Pakistani film actresses
Actresses in Pashto cinema
Actresses in Urdu cinema